Ammophila azteca is a species of thread-waisted wasp in the family Sphecidae.

Subspecies
These two subspecies belong to the species Ammophila azteca:
 Ammophila azteca azteca Cameron, 1888
 Ammophila azteca clemente Menke, 1967

References

Sphecidae
Articles created by Qbugbot
Insects described in 1888